Salvador Becerra Rodríguez (born 20 January 1946) is a Mexican politician affiliated with the National Action Party. As of 2014 he served as Senator of the LVIII and LIX Legislatures of the Mexican Congress representing Jalisco and as Deputy during the LVI Legislature.

References

1946 births
Living people
Politicians from Jalisco
Members of the Senate of the Republic (Mexico)
Members of the Chamber of Deputies (Mexico)
National Action Party (Mexico) politicians
20th-century Mexican politicians
21st-century Mexican politicians
Technical University of Valencia alumni